Luigi Favretti (20 November 1872 – 15 June 1950) was an Italian sports shooter. He competed in the 300m team military rifle event at the 1920 Summer Olympics.

References

External links
 

1872 births
1950 deaths
Sportspeople from the Province of Belluno
Italian male sport shooters
Olympic shooters of Italy
Shooters at the 1920 Summer Olympics